Anita Bose Pfaff (born 29 November 1942) is an Austrian-born economist, who has previously been a professor at the University of Augsburg as well as a politician in the Social Democratic Party of Germany.  She is the daughter of Indian nationalist Subhas Chandra Bose (1897–1945) and his wife Emilie Schenkl.

Early life

Pfaff is the only child of Emilie Schenkl and Subhas Chandra Bose, who—with a view to attempting an armed attack on the British Raj with the help of Imperial Japan—left Schenkl and Pfaff in Europe, and moved to southeast Asia, when Pfaff was four months old.  Pfaff was raised by her mother, who worked shifts in the trunk office during the postwar years to support the family, which included Pfaff's maternal grandmother. Pfaff was not given her father's last name at birth, and grew up as Anita Schenkl.

Academic career

As of 2012, Pfaff was a professor of economics at the University of Augsburg.

Marriage and family

Pfaff is married to Professor Martin Pfaff, who was previously a member of the Bundestag (the German parliament), representing the SPD. They have three children: Peter Arun, Thomas Krishna and Maya Carina.

Media

Pfaff is mentioned in the Bollywood film Netaji Subhas Chandra Bose: The Forgotten Hero.

References

Notes

Citations

External links 
 Subhash Chandra Bose Wife Story
 Anita Bose-Daughter of SC Bose speaks

1942 births
Living people
20th-century Austrian politicians
21st-century Austrian politicians
Subhas Chandra Bose
Academic staff of the University of Augsburg
Austrian people of Bengali descent
Austrian people of Indian descent
Austrian emigrants to Germany
People from Vienna